Open Heart Zoo is a debut album by British alternative rock musician Martin Grech released in 2002. Its title track came to the attention of the public when it was used by Lexus in a commercial, and was released as a single on 30 September 2002.

Track listing
"Here It Comes" – 5:02
"Open Heart Zoo" – 5:20
"Dalí" – 5:38
"Tonight" – 5:07
"Push" – 4:59
"Only One Listening" – 4:51
"Notorious" – 4:55
"Penicillin" – 4:47
"Catch Up" – 3:46
"Twin" – 4:41
"Death of a Loved One" – 20:50*

The duration of "Death of a Loved One" is 6:53 — there is then a 10:05 silence before the bonus track — "Ill" (ill) begins. The duration of "Ill" is 3:52.

Charts

References

2002 debut albums
Martin Grech albums